Ifigenia in Tauride is an opera (opera seria) in three acts by Niccolò Jommelli set to a libretto by the Mannheim court poet Mattia Verazi. It premiered on 30 May 1771 at the Teatro di San Carlo in Naples to celebrate the name day of Ferdinand I of the Two Sicilies. The story is based on Iphigenia in Tauris by Euripides.

Roles

References

External links

Italian-language operas
1771 operas
Operas
Operas based on classical mythology
Operas by Niccolò Jommelli
Operas based on Iphigenia in Tauris